Valery Aleksandrovich Kukhareshin (born 7 December 1957) is a Soviet and Russian stage, film and dubbing actor.

Merited Artist of the Russian Federation (1994), People's Artist of Russia (2005). He is also the official Russian voice of Disney Scrooge McDuck for more than fifteen years, first in the front of the animated series DuckTales of 2004.

Born on 7 December 1957 in Leningrad, Russian SFSR, Soviet Union (now Saint Petersburg, Russia).

Selected filmography
 Understudy Takes Effect (1983) as episode
 Socrates (1991) as Plato
 The Alaska Kid (1993) as man at the ball
 Life and Adventures of Four Friends 2 (1993) as Nikita's dad
 Operation Happy New Year (1996) as Karl Ivanovich
 Anna Karenina (1997) as doctor
 The Romanovs: An Imperial Family (2000) as Leon Trotsky
 Bandit Petersburg (2001) as Colonel Leikin
 Deadly Force (2001) as Prince
 Streets of Broken Lights (2001) as Boris Sergeevich Gostev
 Killer's Diary (2002) as Alexander Blok
 Muhtar's return (2004) as episode
 Brezhnev (2005) as Unkovsky
 Alexander (2008) as Eric XI of Sweden
 Bury Me Behind the Baseboard (2009) as Aaron Moiseevich
 The White Guard (2012) as pathologist
 Catherine the Great (2015) as Mikhail Illarionovich Vorontsov
 Something for Nothing (2016) as Steven Walker
 Anna Karenina: Vronsky's Story (2017) as station head
 Matilda (2017) as episode
 Quiet Comes the Dawn (2019) as Laberin
 The Silver Skates (2020) as a senior chef
 Woland (2022) as Rimsky

References

External links
  Official site

1957 births
Living people
Male actors from Saint Petersburg
Soviet male film actors
Soviet male stage actors
Russian male film actors
Russian male stage actors
Russian male voice actors
Honored Artists of the Russian Federation
Soviet male actors
20th-century Russian male actors
21st-century Russian male actors
People's Artists of Russia
Russian State Institute of Performing Arts alumni